Viscount Dungannon is a title that has been created twice in the Peerage of Ireland. The first creation came in 1662 when Marcus Trevor was made Baron Trevor, of Rostrevor in the County of Down, and Viscount Dungannon. These titles became extinct on the death of the third Viscount in 1706.

The Trevor estates, including Brynkinallt near Chirk, Denbighshire, Wales, passed to the late Viscount Dungannon's kinsman Arthur Hill, who assumed the additional surname of Trevor in 1759. He was the son of Michael Hill and Anne Trevor, daughter of Sir John Trevor and granddaughter of John Trevor, half-brother of Marcus Trevor, 1st Viscount Dungannon. Arthur Hill-Trevor's brother was Trevor Hill, 1st Viscount Hillsborough, from whom the Marquesses of Downshire descend. On 17 February 1766, Arthur Hill-Trevor was created Baron Hill, of Olderfleet, and Viscount Dungannon, in the Peerage of Ireland. This creation of the viscountcy of Dungannon became extinct on the death of the first holder's great-grandson, the third Viscount, in 1862.

The Dungannon estates, including Brynkinallt, passed to the latter's kinsman Lord Edwin Hill, third son of the third Marquess of Downshire, who assumed the additional surname of Trevor and was created Baron Trevor of Brynkinallt in the County of Denbigh, in 1890 (see Baron Trevor for more information).

Viscounts Dungannon, first creation (1662)
Marcus Trevor, 1st Viscount Dungannon (1618–1670)
Lewis Trevor, 2nd Viscount Dungannon (died 1693)
Marcus Trevor, 3rd Viscount Dungannon (1669–1706)

Viscounts Dungannon, second creation (1766)
Arthur Hill-Trevor, 1st Viscount Dungannon (died 1771)
Arthur Hill-Trevor, 2nd Viscount Dungannon (1763–1837)
Arthur Hill-Trevor, 3rd Viscount Dungannon (1798–1862) (elected a representative peer in 1855)

See also
Baron Trevor
Marquess of Downshire
Baron Sandys

References

Extinct viscountcies in the Peerage of Ireland
Noble titles created in 1662
Noble titles created in 1766